Cymbidium erythraeum, the Indian cymbidium, is a species of orchid.

References

External links 

erythraeum
Orchids of India
Orchids of Bhutan